Pain Is a Warning is the ninth album by Today Is the Day, released on August 16, 2011, by Black Market Activities.

Background and recording
Pain Is a Warning is considered by both fans and critics as the band's most accessible work. According to frontman Steve Austin, the intent of the album was to simply be "honest and raw". In an interview with NPR, Austin described their mindset during the writing process of the album as "make up an idea, keep it, make the next idea and then connect it all together."

Lyrically, the album was inspired by the 2007 financial crisis which, according to Austin in a video interview, nearly caused him and his family to go into poverty. The track "Remember to Forget" was written about Austin's mother, who at the time was suffering from Alzheimer's disease. The album's title was inspired from a conversation Austin had with his son.

Track listing

Accolades

Personnel 
Adapted from the Pain Is a Warning liner notes.

Today Is the Day
Steve Austin – vocals, guitar, production
Ryan Jones – bass guitar, backing vocals
Curran Reynolds – drums

Production and additional personnel
Kevin Baker – backing vocals
Kurt Ballou – mixing, recording; guitar on "This Is You"
Alan Douches – mastering
Nate Newton – backing vocals
Mike Wohlberg – design

Release history

References

External links 
 
 Pain Is a Warning at Bandcamp (streamed copy where licensed)

2011 albums
Black Market Activities albums
Today Is the Day albums